Dhoby Ghaut is a place in Singapore that often refers to the Dhoby Ghaut MRT station, a major interchange station on Singapore's Mass Rapid Transit network connecting the North-South Line, North East Line, and the Circle Line. As a place, Dhoby Ghaut lies along the eastern end of Orchard Road. There is a shopping mall above the MRT station called Plaza Singapura.

Etymology

Dhoby Ghaut was influenced from Dhobi Ghat , which literally means washerman's place in Hindi, from dhobi, "washerman" or one that does laundry, and ghat, referring to a series of steps leading down to a body of water, as in the case of the Varanasi ghats by the Ganges. The Hindi term ghat passed into English usage during the British occupation of India, and was later anglicised to ghaut.

Around this time, the British had also ruled Singapore, which influenced naming this area.

Early history

Until the early 1900s, the dhobis used water from a clear stream that flowed into Sungai Bras Basah, now Stamford Canal. This stream now exists as a large drain beside Handy Road. The ghats, or steps leading down to the stream, were demolished when Sungai Bras Basah was canalised. The dhobis would then dry the laundry at Dhoby Green, the open park bounded by Stamford Road, Handy Road, Bras Basah Road and Prinsep Street.

See also
 Dhoby Ghaut, Penang, Malaysia 
 Dhobi Ghat, Mumbai, India

References

External links

Reference from National Library of Singapore Infopedia Website

Places in Singapore
Museum Planning Area
Orchard Road
Laundry places